"Kinky Boots" is a 1960s song written by Herbert Kretzmer and David Lee, and recorded by Patrick Macnee and Honor Blackman, stars of the television series The Avengers. 

The music was commissioned by Ned Sherrin for the satirical television series That Was the Week That Was and used in a sequence featuring the titular footwear (then fashionable). Lyrics were later added for a recording by Macnee and Blackman, released by Decca in February 1964.

The song was not initially a hit, but one re-release of 1990 reached the top ten of the British Singles Chart in December of that year, after the song was promoted by BBC Radio One DJ Simon Mayo.

The single peaked at No.5 (on Deram records label KINKY 1) and remained on the chart for seven weeks. Prior to this, in 1977, it was placed at No.22 in the "Bottom 30" of Kenny Everett's World's Worst Wireless Show. The song is quite short: just one minute and thirty seven seconds long.

Critical reception
Upon the 1990 re-release, Jon Wilde from Melody Maker wrote, "When first released in 1964, this record caused questions to be raised in the Commons and a national controversy was only averted when PM Harold Wilson went on record as saying that he dreamed nightly about Honor "Cathy Gale" Blackman's sexy leather outfits and slick judo moves in The Avengers, along with the normal things like goldfish and skeletons. An inspired reissue then for this magnificent high camp curiosity. Few things in life charm quite like Patrick "John Steed" MacNee's dandified enthusiasm for "frumpy little beat girls" and "sexy little schoolgirls". His matter-of-fact delivery of the line "Leather is so kinky" remains one of the great landmarks in pop history."

Track listing

References

External links
Herbert Kretzmer interview

Patrick Macnee and Honor Blackman songs
Novelty songs
1964 songs
Songs with lyrics by Herbert Kretzmer